Apoorva Sagodharargal is a 1989 Indian Tamil-language masala film directed by Singeetam Srinivasa Rao. The film features an ensemble cast including Kamal Haasan, Jaishankar, Nagesh, Gautami, Rupini, Manorama, Srividya, Janagaraj, Moulee, Delhi Ganesh and Nassar. The plot centers on the twins Raju and Appu, who were separated during childhood, and Appu's quest for revenge against the criminals who killed his father.

Apoorva Sagodharargal was produced by Haasan under the production company Raaj Kamal Films International. The film was written by Panchu Arunachalam, while Haasan and Crazy Mohan wrote the screenplay and dialogues, respectively. B. Lenin and V. T. Vijayan handled editing, and P. C. Sriram served as cinematographer. The music for the film was composed by Ilaiyaraaja, with lyrics by Vaali.

Apoorva Sagodharargal premiered at the International Film Festival of India. The film was theatrically released on 14 April 1989 and was a box office success, completing a 200-day run in theatres. It won the Filmfare Award for Best Film – Tamil, and two Tamil Nadu State Film Awards: Best Actor (Haasan) and Best Lyricist (Vaali).

Plot 
Sethupathi is an honest and upright police officer. When he arrests four bigwigs – Dharmaraj, Francis Anbarasu, Nallasivam and Satyamoorthy – they escape justice easily and return to take revenge. They kill him and poison his pregnant wife Kaveri. However, she manages to survive. She gives birth to twins with the help of a woman named Muniyamma, but the babies are separated due to circumstances. One of the twins, Raja, grows up as a mechanic with Muniyamma, while the other, Appu, a dwarf, grows up in the circus with his mother.

Appu falls in love with Mano, the daughter of the circus owner, mistakenly thinking that she was asking him to elope with her, but she actually had asked him to be a witness to her marriage with her fiancé Vincent, which was not approved by her father. Appu becomes heartbroken and insecure about his height, and he attempts suicide but is stopped by his mother, who then reveals that his dwarfism might have been because of the poison force-fed to her when she was pregnant. This leads Appu to learn about his father's murder and decides to avenge him. Meanwhile, Raja falls in love with Janaki, who happens to be Satyamoorthy's daughter. As Raja resembles Sethupathi, Satyamoorthy and his three accomplices become interested in him.

Appu uses two of his circus Indian Spitz puppies to lure Francis to an abandoned building, and kills him using a Rube Goldberg machine; Francis's corpse falls into a lorry covered with hay. Raja and Janaki have car trouble and hitchhike a ride in the same lorry, oblivious to the corpse. The lorry driver discovers the corpse when he reaches his destination and calls the police. The inspector in charge of the case traces the car number given by the lorry driver and comes to suspect Raja of the murder.

Appu kills Nallasivam in a golf course using a tiger from his circus, but Nallasivam's caddie sees Appu's face, and the tiger's tail from afar. This leads the inspector to Raja again, who, coincidentally, is wearing a tiger costume while performing a song at a festival in the street. Janaki becomes enraged when she learns that Raja is suspected of killing her father's friends and breaks up with him. Raja is released from custody as the postmortem examination has revealed real tiger wounds.

Raja goes to Janaki's house to reconcile, with the inspector following him covertly. While Raja is talking to her, Appu tricks Satyamoorthy into killing himself with a circus handgun that shoots backwards. Appu escapes, but Raja and Janaki enter Satyamoorthy's room, having heard the gunshot a few moments before the inspector arrived. Janaki faints when she sees her father dead, and the inspector now believes that Raja shot Satyamoorthy. Raja escapes and becomes a fugitive. When he is spotted in a market, Raja takes a woman hostage and threatens to kill her, not knowing that the woman is his mother Kaveri. When the crowd backs down, he releases Kaveri and flees. Kaveri realises that Raja is her first son and seeks out Muniyamma. Together they realise that the murders were committed by Appu, and that Raja has been mistaken for Appu, who overhears their conversation.

Dharmaraj believes that it is Raja avenging his father's death and that he is the next target. He is shocked to see Kaveri, whom he believed to be dead. Nonetheless, he kidnaps both Muniyamma and Kaveri, and threatens to kill them unless Raja surrenders to him. Appu escapes, helps Raja evade the police, and tells him everything. They team up and go to the circus where the women are held captive. In the ensuing battle, Appu and Raja overpower Dharmaraj's henchmen and Dharmaraj ends up hanging by a rope. With Kaveri's silent approval, Appu shoots the rope, causing Dharmaraj to fall and be eaten by circus lions. Appu surrenders to the police, while Raja and Janaki reunite.

Cast 

Kamal Haasan as Sethupathi, Appu and Raja
Jaishankar as Sathyamoorthy
Nagesh as Dharmaraj
Gautami as Janaki
Rupini as Mano
Manorama as Muniyamma
Srividya as Kaveri
Janagaraj as the inspector
Moulee as Mano's father
Delhi Ganesh as Francis Anbarasu
Nassar as Nallasivam
R. S. Shivaji as Constable Sambandham
Crazy Mohan as the car owner
Anand as Vincent, Mano's fiancé

Production

Development 
In the mid-1980s, Kamal Haasan developed the desire to act as a dwarf in a feature film, and told Singeetam Srinivasa Rao about it. According to Haasan, the story was originally written for his mentor K. Balachander, who rejected the idea as "too complicated". Since no producers were willing to do the film, Haasan decided to produce it himself. Haasan and Rao developed the "tragic story" of a dwarf who works in a circus, falls in love with a woman who does not reciprocate his feelings, and realises only at the end of the film that she has left him for another man. The film would end with him walking into the desert with his circus troupe. Though shooting took place for a week, Rao became sceptical of the film's feasibility, and the project was dropped.

Afterwards, Haasan and Rao consulted Panchu Arunachalam who said, "you have a unique character – the dwarf; make him the hero and your picture is a hit." Arunachalam made substantial changes to the script, mainly to suit the interests of Kodambakkam audiences. It was his idea for Haasan to play an additional character, Raja, who would be the dwarf Appu's twin brother. According to Rao, the character of Raja was meant to satisfy "the popular audience" while Appu "makes the actual story". To prevent either character from overshadowing the other, Rao brought in additional plot details like "the whole mistaken identity, tiger dance and romance". Haasan initially approached Moulee to write the dialogue, but he declined due to other commitments; the position went to Crazy Mohan. Cinematography was handled by P. C. Sriram and editing by B. Lenin and V. T. Vijayan.

Casting 
Haasan played three roles: Sethupathi, Appu and Raja. For Raja, he wore tight pants and unbuttoned denim shirts with sport shoes, whereas for Appu he wore only clown-like costumes besides regular clothes. Prem Nazir was the initial choice for the character of Sethupathi; because he was unwell at the time, Haasan himself played the role. Nagesh, known primarily as a comedian, was initially apprehensive when Haasan approached him to portray Dharmaraja; he feared the film would fail if audiences did not accept him in a negative role. Rao, Nagesh and Haasan wanted to depict the character as a new kind of villain.

Ganthimathi was originally cast as Appu's foster mother, but following changes in the script, she was replaced by Manorama. Lakshmi was offered to play Sethupathi's wife Kaveri but did not accept, resulting in Srividya being cast. Moulee, despite declining to write the film's dialogues, remained in the cast. Ravikanth and Chinni Jayanth appeared in minor roles as Raja's friends, but their portion were deleted from the final cut. Haasan had included a character for Krishnamachari Srikkanth, but the character was later removed. Stage actor Suppuni was offered the role of a handicapped character, but declined.

Filming and post-production 

The portrayal of a dwarf by the normal-sized Haasan required different techniques for different camera angles. A pair of special shoes was prepared to be attached to the folded knees of the actor for the straight angle shots. Haasan adopted a particular way of holding up his arms to match the appearance of his shortened legs. For the side angle shots, a trench was dug up just to cover up the actor's legs from the feet to knees, with special shoes attached at the knee level. A scientist from Bangalore was employed to assist with the special effects for the dwarf. Rao noted Appu would lend "attention and sympathy from the audience" and he made sure Raja "got equal attention and sympathy".

S. T. Venky made his debut as visual effects designer for this film and also became the first person to use digital technology in visual effects. Animals used in the films were trained by Ravindra Sherpad Deval. The circus portions in the film were filmed at Gemini Circus and in Cochin. The song "Raja Kaiya Vachchaa" had many scenes inspired from Grease (1978), including the transformation of the old car into a new one, and the dramatically changing costumes of the dancers. The song "Ammava Naan" was initially dumped after the script went through changes, but after many days of running successfully in theatres, it was re-included as an added attraction. While filming the climax, Nagesh insisted on performing his own stunts rather than using a double.

Themes and influences 
The title Apoorva Sagodharargal was taken from the 1949 Tamil film of the same name, an adaptation of the novella The Corsican Brothers by Alexandre Dumas. The idea of brothers coming together to avenge the death of their father is the common thread in both films. V. Ramji of Hindu Tamil Thisai felt the names of the villains – Nagesh's Dharmaraj, Jaishankar's Satyamoorthy, Nassar's Nallasivam and Delhi Ganesh's Francis Anbarasu – were in contrast to their personalities. Haasan compared the film to Yaadon Ki Baaraat (1973) because it features the concept of "a family being destroyed by the villain, brothers being separated and reunited". Balaji of Indolink compared it to Twins (1988) as both films feature "a pair of  'imperfect' twins".

Soundtrack 
The music was composed by Ilaiyaraaja. All the songs were written by Vaali, while Prem Dhawan and Rajasri wrote the lyrics for the Hindi and Telugu versions. According to Ilaiyaraaja, Haasan explained a particular situation in the story and Ilaiyaraaja composed a tune, but Haasan, despite liking the tune offered, was not overall satisfied. He then presented the song "Naan Paarthathile", composed by M. S. Viswanathan for Anbe Vaa (1966) and based on that Ilaiyaraaja composed the song "Puthu Maappillaikku". Haasan has stated that, after watching a performance at an Academy Awards ceremony, he wanted Ilaiyaraaja to compose a song like that; this resulted in the lines "Bababa... Bababari... Pudhu Mapillaikku".

The song "Unna Nenachen" was rewritten by Vaali multiple times and Haasan was still unhappy with it; only his sixth attempt satisfied Haasan. The song "Raja Kaiya Vachchaa" has two versions, one by Haasan, which was used in the film and in the audio cassette, and another sung by S. P. Balasubrahmanyam, which was included in the audio LP. Elements of "Annatha Aadurar" were used in the song "Saroja Saman Nikalo" from Chennai 600028 (2007). Following Vaali's death in 2013, The Hindu included "Unna Nenachen" among his best songs in their collection, "Best of Vaali: From 1964 – 2013".

Release 

Apoorva Sagodharargal was released on 14 April 1989 (Puthandu). Despite facing competition from other Puthandu releases such as Pudhea Paadhai, En Rathathin Rathame and Pillaikkaga, the film became a major commercial success: it was the first Tamil film to run for 100 days in five theatres in Bangalore, and overall completed a theatrical run of 200 days. The film was dubbed into Telugu as Vichithra Sodarulu, and into Hindi as Appu Raja and released in 1990.

Critical reception 
Ananda Vikatans review said that while there were three Haasans, the actor was stunning in his performance as Appu. P. S. S. of Kalki called the story formulaic, but praised the execution. Khalid Mohamed of The Times of India wrote, "Though [Kamal Haasan] dominates the show from the first frame to the last, the ensemble spirit is forever palpable: the ring-rang rock pop music score by Ilaiyaraja and the dynamic camerawork by P.C. Sriram of Nayakan contribute immensely to the picture's lightning impact."

Accolades

Cancelled sequel 
Haasan had considered making a sequel to Apoorva Sagodharargal, which would revolve around Appu escaping from prison. He even had one scene ready, and described it in 2021 as being "high up in the mountains with a high tension cable walk and Appu would be the only man to walk across the high tension cable but unfortunately, he chooses a windy day and that's how he loses his pole". The film was later dropped because, according to Haasan, "we wanted to stop being technobrats and become entertainers".

Legacy 
After the success of Apoorva Sagodharargal, Haasan and Mohan worked together on numerous films, including Michael Madana Kama Rajan (1990), Magalir Mattum (1994), Sathi Leelavathi (1995), Avvai Shanmugi (1996), Kaathala Kaathala (1998), Thenali (2000), Panchatanthiram (2002), Pammal K. Sambandam (2003) and Vasool Raja MBBS (2004). The Times of India wrote that Haasan "created history by playing a dwarf who was almost half his original height". In 2010, Rediff wrote: "Under Singeetham's very able direction, the movie blended mainstream cinema and emotion very well, [...] and marked the beginning of what was to be a long career, for Kamal Haasan, in getting more into the skin of his character, and setting higher standards for himself with the aid of superior make-up and body language." On Haasan's birthday, 7 November 2015, Latha Srinivasan of Daily News and Analysis considered Apoorva Sagodharargal to be one of the "films you must watch to grasp the breadth of Kamal Haasan's repertoire".

The film was included by Rediff in their list of Kamal Haasan's ten best films. Malathi Rangarajan of The Hindu noted that Haasan's commitment to playing a dwarf in Apoorva Sagotharargal "helped him scale heights, not many can reach". Baradwaj Rangan compared I (2015) to Apoorva Sagotharargal, saying that in both films, "a noxious substance results in the hero's ‘deformity’, and when he discovers how he came to be this way, he doles out punishment in inventive ways". Director Vinayan said that his Malayalam film Athbhutha Dweepu (2005) was inspired by Apoorva Sagodharargal. Rangan compared Mersal (2017) to Apoorva Sagodharargal, saying that in both films, "A father is brutally murdered. A son takes revenge. The other son is thought to be the killer."

In popular culture 
The 1990 film Raja Kaiya Vacha was named after the song from Apoorva Sagodharargal. The theme music from the film was humorously remixed as the "Gopi Bat Theme" in Chennai 600028 II (2016). In Periya Marudhu (1994), Sodalai (Goundamani) imagines himself as a dwarf similar to Appu and dances to the song "Pudhu Mappillaiku". The scene where Appu uses a Rube Goldberg contraption to kill Francis Anbarasu was parodied in Thamizh Padam (2010), with Delhi Ganesh reprising his role.

See also 
Cultural depictions of dwarfism

Notes

References

Bibliography

External links 
 

1980s masala films
1980s Tamil-language films
1989 films
Circus films
Fictional portrayals of the Tamil Nadu Police
Films directed by Singeetam Srinivasa Rao
Films scored by Ilaiyaraaja
Films with screenplays by Crazy Mohan
Films with screenplays by Kamal Haasan
Indian films about revenge
Twins in Indian films
Films about people with dwarfism